Scout Lake is a hamlet in the Canadian province of Saskatchewan.

Demographics 

References

Designated places in Saskatchewan
Organized hamlets in Saskatchewan
Willow Bunch No. 42, Saskatchewan
Division No. 3, Saskatchewan